Jorge García or Garcia may refer to:

Arts and entertainment
Jorge García Usta (1960–2005), Colombian novelist, poet, essayist and journalist
Jorge Garcia (born 1973), American actor
Jorge Eduardo García (actor) (born 2002), Mexican actor

Politics
Jorge García Montes (1896–1982), Cuban politician
Jorge García Granados (1900–1961), Guatemalan politician
Jorge Cruickshank García (1915–1989), Mexican politician
Jorge García Carneiro (1952–2021), Venezuelan politician
Jorge Luis Garcia (1953–2010), Democratic politician from Arizona
Jorge Luis García Pérez (born 1964), Cuban human rights activist
Jorge Mario García Laguardia, Guatemalan jurist

Religion
Jorge García Isaza (1928–2016), Colombian bishop

Sports
Jorge García (alpine skier) (born 1956), Spanish alpine skier
Jorge García (athlete) (born 1961), Spanish Olympic athlete
Jorge García (Chilean weightlifter) (born 1987), Chilean weightlifter
Jorge García (kayaker) (born 1988), Cuban Olympic sprint canoer
Jorge García (windsurfer) (born 1962), Argentine Olympic windsurfer
Jorge García Marín (born 1980), Spanish racing cyclist

Association football
Jorge García (footballer, born 1956), Argentine football defender and manager
Jorge García (footballer, born 1957), Spanish football goalkeeper
Jorge García (footballer, born 1969), Argentine football forward
Jorge García (footballer, born 1984), Spanish football defender
Jorge García (footballer, born 1986), Uruguayan football midfielder
Jorge García (footballer, born 1998), Nicaraguan footballer forward
Jorge García (footballer, born 2002), Mexican footballer defender